Hot Tub Time Machine is a 2010 American science-fiction comedy film directed by Steve Pink and starring John Cusack, Rob Corddry, Craig Robinson, Clark Duke, Crispin Glover, Lizzy Caplan, and Chevy Chase. The film was released on March 26, 2010. It follows four men who travel back in time to 1986 via a hot tub, and must find a way to return to 2010. A sequel, Hot Tub Time Machine 2, was released on February 20, 2015.

Plot
Three estranged, depressed friends—Adam Yates, a workaholic who was dumped by his girlfriend; neglected husband Nick Webber-Agnew, who works a dead-end job; and Lou Dorchen, an alcoholic slacker in his 40s—reconnect in 2010 when Lou is hospitalized with carbon monoxide poisoning. 

Although Lou denies that he attempted suicide, Adam and Nick arrange for him to join them and Adam's slacker nephew Jacob at Kodiak Valley Ski Resort, where the three enjoyed themselves in their youth. When they arrive, they find that the town is not what it used to be, with many of the stores boarded up and the hotel run down.

While drinking in their hotel room's hot tub, the four accidentally douse the console with an energy drink. The next day, they go skiing, and after many strange occurrences, realize they have traveled back to 1986. Adam, Lou, and Nick have also assumed their younger bodies, although Jacob's appearance has not changed since he was not born yet, though he occasionally flickers.

A cryptic repairman appears and warns them not to change anything, as it might affect history. To minimize the butterfly effect, the group plans to re-enact their experiences: Adam has to break up with his girlfriend Jenny and get stabbed in the eye with a fork; Lou must pick a fight with and get beaten up by Blaine, a ski patrol bully; Nick must have sex with a groupie and perform with his band at an open microphone event. They also find Adam's sister—and Jacob's mother—Kelly at the resort.

The three find their tasks difficult; Lou gets punched by Blaine and loses his backpack, but realizes he must face him again later at night, so he reluctantly challenges him again. Adam becomes attracted to Jenny again and loses the will to break up, but is distracted when he meets free-spirited music journalist April during a concert. Nick is concerned about cheating on his wife, even though he has not married yet at the time.

Jenny turns the tables on Adam when she initiates their breakup, but he still gets stabbed in the eye with a fork after he tries to prevent it. He wanders around the resort alone before encountering April, they break into a home and become intimate. Meanwhile, Nick covers more upbeat music during his performance. When the repairman tells Jacob a chemical is the key to their time travel, Jacob realizes it was the energy drink they spilled.

After the group prevents Lou from falling off the rooftop, they go to Blaine's cabin to search for the drink. Lou seduces Kelly but, when Jacob interrupts them having sex, he suddenly vanishes. They realize that Lou is Jacob's father as he reappears after Lou and Kelly finish conceiving him. Leaving Kelly, Lou finally beats Blaine, and the four retrieve the energy drink and return to the hot tub where they create a vortex.

Jacob and Nick enter the tub first, but Lou decides to stay in 1986, admitting to Adam that his carbon monoxide poisoning was a suicide attempt. Knowing the future, he intends to make investments and have a closer relationship with Jacob. Adam wants to stay too, but Lou throws him into the vortex at the last moment.

Back in 2010, Adam, Nick, and Jacob discover that Lou has changed history by founding the immensely successful Lougle, which affords him a luxurious lifestyle with Kelly. Adam discovers that he is happily married to April, while Nick is a successful music producer married to a loving and supportive wife. They reunite at Lou's mansion with their families, satisfied with their new lives.

Cast

 John Cusack as Adam Yates
 Jake Rose as 1986 Adam
 Rob Corddry as Lou "Violator" Dorchen
 Brook Bennett as 1986 Lou
 Craig Robinson as Nick Webber-Agnew
 Aliu Oyofo as 1986 Nick
 Clark Duke as Jacob Yates
 Chevy Chase as Repairman
 Collette Wolfe as Kelly Yates
 Crispin Glover as Phil Wedmaier
 Sebastian Stan as Blaine
 Lizzy Caplan as April Drennan
 Crystal Lowe as Zoe
 Kellee Stewart as Courtney Agnew
 Odessa Rojen as 9-year-old Courtney
 Lyndsy Fonseca as Jenny
 Charlie McDermott as Chaz
 Jessica Paré as Tara
 William Zabka as Rick Steelman

Production
Steve Pink directed the movie and Josh Heald wrote the screenplay. It was filmed primarily at the Vancouver Film Studios in Vancouver and the Fernie Alpine Resort in Fernie, British Columbia. Kelvin Humenny served as the art director for the film.

Marketing
The first trailer for the film and the red-band trailer appeared on July 24, 2009, at Comic-Con 2009 and on the Internet. A second red-band trailer was released on January 26, 2010. The film was screened for free in multiple North American cities in the weeks leading up to its release.

On March 29, 2010, Corddry and Duke were guest hosts on WWE Raw from the US Airways Center in Phoenix, Arizona, to promote the film. Robinson did make a short appearance, but only via satellite.

Release
The film opened at number three with a weekend gross of $14 million in 2,754 theaters, averaging $5,091 per theater.  Hot Tub Time Machine grossed $50.3 million in North America and $14.3 million in other territories for a worldwide total of $64.6 million against a budget of $36 million. It was the last film released and self-distributed theatrically by MGM due to the studio's financial difficulties, until Creed III in 2023. 

Hot Tub Time Machine was released on DVD and Blu-ray Disc on June 29, 2010. An unrated version was also released, with the Blu-ray Disc containing a digital copy.

Reception

On Rotten Tomatoes, Hot Tub Time Machine has an approval rating of 64% based on 212 reviews on the Tomatometer, a viewer score of 56% based on more than 10,000 reviews, and an average rating of 6.1/10. The website's critical consensus reads: "Its flagrantly silly scriptand immensely likable castmake up for most of its flaws." On Metacritic, the film has a score of 63 out of 100 based on 36 critics, indicating "generally favorable reviews". Audiences polled by CinemaScore gave the film an average grade of "B" on an A+ to F scale.

The New York Times critic A. O. Scott stated: 

Roger Ebert gave the film three stars out of four:

Soundtrack

The soundtrack for the film, officially titled Hot Tub Time Machine (Music From the Motion Picture), was released in 2010 by Rhino Entertainment. Several of the songs were sung by members of the film.

Some tracks have artists in parentheses; this is the artist who originally performed the song.
 "Louder Than a Bomb" – Public Enemy
 "Perfect Way" – Scritti Politti
 "The Safety Dance" (extended 12" EP remastered version) – Men Without Hats
 "What You Need" (Single/LP version) – INXS
 "Modern Love" (Single version; 2002 digital remaster) – David Bowie
 "I Will Dare" – The Replacements
 "Push It" (album version) – Salt-n-Pepa
 "Bring On the Dancing Horses" – Echo & the Bunnymen
 "Save It for Later" – The Beat (known as The English Beat in the USA)
 "True" – Spandau Ballet
 "Jessie's Girl" (Rick Springfield) – Craig Robinson
 "Bizarre Love Triangle" (Shep Pettibone 12" Remastered Remix) – New Order
 "Once in a Lifetime" (2006 Remastered version) – Talking Heads
 "Home Sweet Home" – Mötley Crüe (also performed by Rob Corddry during the closing credits)
 "Let's Get It Started" (The Black Eyed Peas) – Craig Robinson
 "Hero" - Enrique Iglesias
Not included in the album
The following songs were featured in the film, but not included in the soundtrack album:

 "(I Just) Died in Your Arms" – Cutting Crew
 "Dancing On A Volcano" – Tamplin
 "Bar Bet" – Jake Monaco
 "Blind Man" – Newton Talks
 "Careless Whisper" (George Michael) – Craig Robinson
 "Cry Tough" – Poison
 "Cubicle" -The Ultra-Infidels
 "Heaven's Sake" – Perfect
 "I Can't Wait" – Nu Shooz
 "I Heard a Rumor" – Ghost Swami
 "I Want to Know What Love Is" – Foreigner
 "Keep Your Eye on the Money" – Mötley Crüe
 "Kickstart My Heart" – Mötley Crüe
 "My Block" – Cham Pain
 "Mystery" – The Little Wands
 "Obsession" – Animotion
 "Occam's Razor" – Ocha la Rocha
 "Patrolio" – Jake Monaco
 "Skin I'm In" – Static Revenger featuring Luciana
 "Smooth Up in Ya" – BulletBoys
 "Talk Dirty to Me" – Poison
 "The Stripper" – David Rose
 "Turn Up the Radio" – Autograph
 "Venus" – The Jerry Ross Symphosium
 "Yes Man" – The Little Wands

Sequel

Although not a huge commercial success, strong home video sales prompted a sequel to Hot Tub Time Machine. Corddry, Robinson, Duke, Chase, Wolfe, and Stewart all reprised their roles, while Adam Scott was an addition to the cast in the role of Adam Yates Jr., the son of Cusack’s character. Cusack appears in an uncredited cameo in the unrated home video release of the film.

Released on February 20, 2015, the sequel was panned by critics and was a box-office failure, grossing less money in its entire theatrical run ($12.3 million domestically) than the original made in its opening weekend ($14 million).

References

External links

 
 
 

2010s adventure comedy films
2010s science fiction comedy films
American adventure comedy films
American buddy comedy films
American science fiction comedy films
American screwball comedy films
Films about vacationing
Films directed by Steve Pink
Films produced by John Morris
Films scored by Christophe Beck
Films set in 1986
Films set in 2010
Films shot in California
Films shot in Vancouver
Metro-Goldwyn-Mayer films
Films about alcoholism
American skiing films
Films with screenplays by John Morris
Films with screenplays by Sean Anders
Films about time travel
United Artists films
Films set in the 1980s
2010s buddy comedy films
2010 comedy films
2010 films
2010s English-language films
2010s American films